Neudorf is a village in the Canadian province of Saskatchewan within the Rural Municipality of McLeod No. 185 and Census Division No. 5. It is on Highway 22 east of Lemberg, and Abernethy, and west of Killaly.

The community was established prior to the arrival of the Canadian Pacific Railway; when it arrived the community was designated a divisional point, leading to a population boom.

History 
Neudorf incorporated as a village on April 25, 1905.

Demographics 

Notables
 Dick Assman - Petro-Canada employee, known for appearing on the Late Show with David Letterman
 Doreen Kimura - Professor at Simon Fraser University, winner of the Kistler Prize
 Ed Litzenberger - NHL hockey player
 Brian Propp - NHL hockey player
 Percy Saltzman - First English-speaking Weatherman in Canada
 Jarret Stoll - NHL hockey player
 Henry Taube - Won the Nobel Prize in Chemistry

References

Villages in Saskatchewan
McLeod No. 185, Saskatchewan
Division No. 5, Saskatchewan